Todd McKenney (born October 11, 1963) is a Judge of the Barberton Municipal Court in Summit County. McKenney formerly served as a Judge of the Summit County Common Pleas Court, Probate and General Division. He was formerly a member of the Ohio General Assembly, serving the 43rd District from January 3, 2011 until resigning November 16, 2011 to take the Judicial Appointment from Governor John Kasich after the retirement of Judge Bill Spicer. Governor John Kasich appointed Judge Todd McKenney to fill the seat on the Barberton Municipal Court bench on April 11, 2014. In November 2014, Judge McKenney was elected to the Summit County Court of Common Pleas. Judge McKenney ran for a full term in 2016, was narrowly defeated, then in 2017 Judge McKenney returned to the Barberton Municipal Court and was elected to a full six year term.

Career
After graduation from Hiram College and The Ohio State University College of Law, McKenney served as a judicial law clerk to federal Judge David D. Dowd, Jr. He also served as a pastor, attorney and on the New Franklin City Council. In 2021, Judge Todd and his wife Bethany McKenney were awarded the Albert and Iris Gilbert Humanitarian Award of the Year by the Ohio District Kiwanis for significant acts of caring and community service.

Initiatives
While Summit County Probate Judge, McKenney initiated the Summit County Good Deeds Project which identified and educated thousands of Summit County residents about making survivorship deed updates to avoid probate when property is transferred upon death. For his efforts Judge McKenney received Akron Bar Association's Liberty Bell Award in 2013.

Summit County Probate Judge

Todd McKenney officially took office November 18, 2011.

References

External links
 official campaign site
www.ohio.com

1963 births
Living people
Hiram College alumni
Ohio lawyers
Ohio Republicans
Ohio State University Moritz College of Law alumni
Politicians from Akron, Ohio
21st-century American politicians